The Illovo River is in KwaZulu-Natal Province, South Africa.  It rises in the upper Illovo area in the Richmond vicinity near the Drakensberg, and empties into the Indian Ocean near Winklespruit.

The name Illovo is derived from the Zulu name of a tree called "ilovo".

References

Rivers of KwaZulu-Natal